The Sun Odyssey 439 is a French sailboat that was designed by Philippe Briand as a cruiser and first built in 2011.

The boat shares a hull design with the Sun Odyssey 44 DS and was developed into the Sun Odyssey 449 in 2015.

Production
The design was built by Jeanneau in France, from 2011 to 2015, but it is now out of production.

Design
The Sun Odyssey 439 is a recreational keelboat, built predominantly of polyester fiberglass, with wood trim. The hard-chine hull is solid fiberglass, while the deck as a balsa core. It has a fractional sloop rig, with a deck-stepped mast, two sets of swept spreaders and aluminum spars with 1X19 stainless steel wire rigging. The hull has a plumb stem, a reverse transom with a drop-down tailgate, an internally mounted spade-type rudder controlled by dual wheels and a fixed "L"-shaped fin keel with a weighted bulb or optional shoal-draft keel.

The fin keel model displaces  empty and carries  of cast iron ballast, while the shoal draft version displaces  empty and carries  of ballast.

The design has sleeping accommodation for four to seven people, with a double "V"-berth in the bow cabin, a second single cabin on the port side, a "U"-shaped settee and a straight settee in the main cabin and two aft cabins, each with a double berth. The smaller forward cabin may be omitted and the larger bow cabin then fitted with a double island berth. The port aft cabin may also be omitted, giving a larger aft starboard cabin. The galley is located on the port side just forward of the companionway ladder. The galley is "L"-shaped and is equipped with a two-burner stove, an ice box and a double sink. There are two heads, one just aft of the bow cabin on the starboard side and one on the port side, aft.

Operational history
In a 2012 review for Sail Magazine, Adam Cort concluded, "the latest iteration of the Sun Odyssey program is predicated on an approach that emphasizes speed, accommodations and a sailor-friendly rig and deck layout. All three elements are very much in evidence aboard the Sun Odyssey 439."

In a 2013 Cruising World review, Alvah Simon wrote, "the wind gods of the Chesapeake favored us with 10-18 knots of breeze on our test day. We easily managed 7 knots respectably close to the wind, and hit the polar predictions on all other points of sail. Partially due to the in-mast furling system, I felt the gooseneck was inordinately high above the waterline. This not only reduces the mainsail area but also raises the center of effort, both detracting from the overall sailing performance. This may account for the excess weather helm we experienced. I believe the traditional slab-reefing mainsail option is more congruent with the 439’s performance persona."

See also
List of sailing boat types

References

External links

Keelboats
2010s sailboat type designs
Sailing yachts
Sailboat type designs by Philippe Briand
Sailboat types built by Jeanneau